Diboron tetrachloride is a chemical compound with the formula B2Cl4. It is a colorless liquid.

Synthesis
The modern synthesis involves dechlorination of boron trichloride using copper.  

It can also be formed by the electrical discharge procedure of boron trichloride at low temperatures:
BCl3 → BCl2 + Cl
Cl + Hg (electrode) → HgCl or HgCl2
2 BCl2 → B2Cl4

Reactions
The compound is used as a reagent for the synthesis of organoboron compounds. For instance, diboron tetrachloride reacts with ethylene:
CH2=CH2 + B2Cl4 → Cl2B–CH2–CH2–BCl2

The compound absorbs hydrogen quickly at room temperature:

3 B2Cl4 + 3 H2 → B2H6 + 4 BCl3

References

Chlorides
Boron compounds
Nonmetal halides
Boron halides